Richmond McGee (born April 25, 1983) is a former American football punter. He was signed by the Philadelphia Eagles as a street free agent in 2008. He played college football at Texas.

He has also been a member of the Chicago Bears and Cleveland Browns.

Early years
McGee attended Garland High School in Garland, Texas and was a student and a letterman in football. In football, as a junior, he helped his team win the 1999 Texas 5A Division II State Championship team. Richmond McGee graduated from Garland High School in 2001.

College career
McGee was a college football placekicker for the University of Texas Longhorns.  He played four years for the team and handled at various times the punts, kickoffs, and field goals.  He was the starting kicker for the Longhorn football team as they won the NCAA National Championship.

His primary duty was as a punter, but he also had experience as a placekicker.  During 2003 he was the starting punter for the team,  and also handled all the kick-offs.

As a member of the 2004 Texas Longhorns football team he made the only field goal he attempted.  On the 2005 Texas Longhorns football team he made four successful kicks out of five attempts.

Professional career
McGee was eligible for the 2006 NFL Draft but was not selected.

Philadelphia Eagles
On April 16, 2008, the Philadelphia Eagles signed McGee to a three-year contract. He was waived on August 26.

Chicago Bears
McGee signed a one-year contract with the Chicago Bears on July 31, 2009. He was waived on August 31. He was re-signed on December 28 after an injury to punter Brad Maynard. He was waived again on August 4, 2010. He was re-signed to the team's practice squad on October 26, 2010.  His contract was terminated on November 2, 2010. On February 18, 2011, the Bears signed McGee to a two-year deal. He was waived on August 1.

Cleveland Browns
He signed with the Cleveland Browns on August 3, 2011. He was placed on injured reserve September 13, 2011 following a week 1 injury and the signing of Brad Maynard. He was waived following the 2011 season on March 13, 2012.

References

External links
Official website
Chicago Bears bio

1983 births
Living people
People from Garland, Texas
Players of American football from Texas
American football placekickers
American football punters
Texas Longhorns football players
Philadelphia Eagles players
Chicago Bears players
Cleveland Browns players
Sportspeople from the Dallas–Fort Worth metroplex